Mayoral elections were held in the Turkish Province of Yalova on 30 March 2014, as part of the nationwide local elections occurring on the same day. A total of 14 municipal mayors were elected in Yalova Province, with one mayor from Central Yalova, five mayors from neighbouring districts and 8 mayors from rural  (small towns).

Background

30 March election
The elections in central Yalova, the largest district and namesake of Yalova Province, were contested by Yakup Koçal, who had been elected as a Democrat in the 2009 local elections but switched to the Justice and Development Party (AKP) in 2013. His main challenger was Vefa Salman, the candidate of the main opposition Republican People's Party (CHP). On the initial election held on 30 March 2014, initial results gave Salman a narrow victory, though subsequent recounts requested by the AKP put Koçal ahead by a single vote. A large recount, requested by the CHP's only MP for Yalova, Muharrem İnce, again resulted in Salman claiming victory. Subsequent investigations by the Supreme Electoral Council of Turkey cancelled the election altogether due to allegations of misconduct from both sides and the inability to establish the victor after numerous recounts.

1 June election
Fresh elections were scheduled for 1 June 2014, along with other repeat elections in different provinces from 30 March that had been cancelled on similar grounds. The vote and count proceeded with relatively little controversy, with Salman emerging as the narrow winner with a majority of 228 votes (0.4%). Koçal subsequently conceded defeat.

Despite the CHP's victory in central Yalova, the AKP took 9 of the 14 municipalities up for election in the Province, with the CHP taking the remaining five.

Results

References

2014 Turkish local elections
Yalova Central District